Thriplow Peat Holes is a  biological Site of Special Scientific Interest north-east of Thriplow in Cambridgeshire.

The site has rare alder carr and fen habitats which have a wide variety of invertebrates, which is enhanced by ditches and ponds. The main vegetation is alder, ash, willow and guelder rose.

The site is private land with no public access.

References

Sites of Special Scientific Interest in Cambridgeshire